Gopinath Pillai (born 1937)  is a Singaporean diplomat and businessperson of Indian ancestry. Currently an ambassador-at-large at Singapore's Ministry of Foreign Affairs, he was honoured by the Indian government in 2012 with the Padma Shri, the fourth highest Indian civilian award.

Biography
Pillai was born in Singapore to K. S. Pillai, a journalist who ran a daily, Kerala Bandhu, known to be the only Malayalam language daily published outside India. He spent eight years of his childhood in Kerala, India, where his family is from, as he could not return to Singapore due to the outbreak of World War II. Afterwards, with the closure of the daily, his family finances dwindled and Pillai opted for government-funded education. His graduate studies were at the University of Malaya, where he obtain a B.A. in 1961 and was a member of the Socialist Club.

Pillai's career started as a journalist with Reuters but had to abandon the job to fulfil his commitment to the government to work as a teacher, a prerequisite for availing government funding for education in Singapore. Later, he joined Bangkok Bank as an Economic Research Officer and also worked as a correspondent for the Far Eastern Economic Review. He worked with the bank for five years and moved to Malaysian Industrial Development Finance Bhd as an economist, during which time Singapore became a separate country in 1965. He stayed in Malaysia until 1969, when he returned to Singapore with his family to take up an appointment as the head of a government-run textile factory. Later, he worked at United Industrial Corporation and then the State Trading Corporation for around 10 years in total.

Pillai attends conferences and seminars and delivers keynote addresses. He has authored two books, The History of Banking in Thailand and The Political Economy of South Asian Diaspora: Patterns of Socio-Economic Influence.

Government and diplomatic career
Pillai is the first chairman of NTUC FairPrice when it was launched in 1983, a post he held until 1993. He remains as a Trustee of NTUC FairPrice. Pillai's diplomatic career started with his assignment with the Parliamentary Committee on Defence and Foreign Affairs in the 1980s. In 1990, he was appointed as Singapore's non-resident Ambassador to Iran, a post he held until 2008. Later, he served as Singapore's High Commissioner to Pakistan. Pillai is an incumbent Ambassador-at-Large at Singapore's Ministry of Foreign Affairs.

Business career
Pillai launched KSP Group along with two of his friends, Sat Pal Khattar and Haider Sithawalla, and holds the post of a Director of the company. The company has since been rebranded as KSP Investments Private Limited, and serves as the holding company for Pillai's business investments. He is reported to have invested in a number of businesses and holds positions in many of them. He is the executive chairman of Savant Infocomm, an IT company, Playware Studios Pte Ltd and holds the chairmanship of companies such as Windmill International Private Limited and Gateway Distriparks Limited and one of its subsidiaries, Snowman Logistics Limited. He is the director of another Gateway Distriparks subsidiary, Gateway Rail Freight Limited and JTC Consultancy Services (Holdings) Private Limited. He is also the director of AEC Edu Group Private Limited and holds directorship of two of its subsidiaries, AEC College and AEC Education Plc.

Social career
Pillai is the chairman of the Management Board of the Institute of South Asian Studies, a National University of Singapore-funded research institute. He also holds the post of the deputy chairman of Ang Mo Kio-Thye Hua Kwan Hospital a healthcare centre in Singapore for rehabilitative care.

Awards and recognitions
Pillai, a recipient of the Meritorious Award and Friend of Labour Award from National Trades Union Congress (NTUC) and Distinguished Alumni Award from the National University of Singapore, received the MCD Award from the Ministry of Community Development and Sports in 1998. In 1999, he received the Public Service Star Award. Singapore Computer Society conferred on him the Friend of IT Award in 2001 and the Singaporean government honoured Pillai, in 2009, with the National Day Award. The Indian government included him in the Republic Day honours list in 2012 for the civilian honour of Padma Shri. In August 2022, he was conferred the Darjah Utama Bakti Cemerlang (Distinguished Service Order) by the Singapore government.

Personal life
Pillai is married and the couple have four children.

See also

 National Day Awards
 Public Service Star Award BBM
 Ambassador-at-Large
 National Trade Union Congress

References

Further reading

External links
 
 
 
 

Singaporean diplomats
Living people
Singaporean people of Indian descent
Singaporean people of Malayali descent
Malayali people
Businesspeople of Indian descent
Recipients of the Padma Shri in trade and industry
Recipients of the Bintang Bakti Masyarakat
People from Singapore
Singaporean businesspeople
High Commissioners of Singapore to Pakistan
1937 births
Singaporean trade unionists
Recipients of the Darjah Utama Bakti Cemerlang